The wild turkey (Meleagris gallopavo) is an upland game bird native to North America, one of two extant species of turkey and the heaviest member of the order Galliformes. It is the ancestor to the domestic turkey, which was originally derived from a southern Mexican subspecies of wild turkey (not the related ocellated turkey).

Description

Adult wild turkeys have long reddish-yellow to grayish-green legs. The body feathers are generally blackish and dark, sometimes grey brown overall with a coppery sheen that becomes more complex in adult males. Adult males, called toms or gobblers, have a large, featherless, reddish head, red throat, and red wattles on the throat and neck. The head has fleshy growths called caruncles. Juvenile males are called jakes; the difference between an adult male and a juvenile is that the jake has a very short beard and his tail fan has longer feathers in the middle. The adult male's tail fan feathers will be all the same length. When males are excited, a fleshy flap on the bill (called a snood) expands, and this, the wattles and the bare skin of the head and neck all become engorged with blood. Each foot has three toes in front, with a shorter, rear-facing toe in back; males have a spur behind each of their lower legs.

Male turkeys have a long, dark, fan-shaped tail and glossy bronze wings. As with many other species of the Galliformes, turkeys exhibit strong sexual dimorphism. The male is substantially larger than the female, and his feathers have areas of red, purple, green, copper, bronze, and gold iridescence. The preen gland (uropygial gland) is also larger in male turkeys compared to female ones. In contrast to the majority of other birds, they are colonized by bacteria of unknown function (Corynebacterium uropygiale). Females, called hens, have feathers that are duller overall, in shades of brown and gray. Parasites can dull coloration of both sexes; in males, coloration may serve as a signal of health. The primary wing feathers have white bars. Turkeys have 5000 to 6000 feathers.

Tail feathers are of the same length in adults, different lengths in juveniles. Males typically have at least one "beard", a tuft of coarse hair-like filaments (mesofiloplumes), growing from the center of the breast. Approximately 10% of females have a beard, usually shorter and thinner than that of the male.

The wing chord is only . The bill is also relatively small, as adults measure  in culmen length.

While it is usually rather lighter than the waterfowl, after the trumpeter swan (Cygnus buccinator), the turkey has the second heaviest maximum weight of any North American bird. Going on average mass, several other birds on the continent, including the American white pelican (Pelecanus erythrorhynchos), the tundra swan (Cygnus columbianus columbianus) and the very rare California condor (Gymnogyps californianus) and whooping crane (Grus americana) surpass the mean weight of turkeys.

Habitat

Wild turkeys prefer hardwood and mixed conifer-hardwood forests with scattered openings such as pastures, fields, orchards and seasonal marshes. They seemingly can adapt to virtually any dense native plant community as long as coverage and openings are widely available. Open, mature forest with a variety of interspersion of tree species appear to be preferred. In the Northeast of North America, turkeys are most profuse in hardwood timber of oak-hickory (Quercus-Carya) and forests of red oak (Quercus rubra), beech (Fagus grandifolia), cherry (Prunus serotina) and white ash (Fraxinus americana). Best ranges for turkeys in the Coastal Plain and Piedmont sections have an interspersion of clearings, farms, and plantations with preferred habitat along principal rivers and in cypress (Taxodium distichum) and tupelo (Nyssa sylvatica) swamps.

In Appalachian and Cumberland plateaus, birds occupy mixed forest of oaks and pines on southern and western slopes, also hickory with diverse understories. Bald cypress and sweet gum (Liquidambar styraciflua) swamps of s. Florida; also hardwood of Cliftonia (a heath) and oak in north-central Florida. Lykes Fisheating Creek area of s. Florida has up to 51% cypress, 12% hardwood hammocks, 17% glades of short grasses with isolated live oak (Quercus virginiana); nesting in neighboring prairies. Original habitat here was mainly longleaf pine (Pinus palustris) with turkey oak (Quercus laevis) and slash pine (Pinus caribaea) "flatwoods," now mainly replaced by slash pine plantations.

Behavior

Flight

Despite their weight, wild turkeys, unlike their domesticated counterparts, are agile, fast fliers. In ideal habitat of open woodland or wooded grasslands, they may fly beneath the canopy top and find perches. They usually fly close to the ground for no more than 400 m (a quarter mile).

Wild turkeys have very good eyesight, but their vision is very poor at night. They will generally not see a predator until it is too late. At twilight most turkeys will head for the trees and roost well off the ground: it is safer to sleep there in numbers than to risk being victim to predators who hunt by night. Because wild turkeys don't migrate, in snowier parts of the species's habitat like the Northeast, Rockies, much of Canada, and the Midwest, it is very important for this bird to learn to select large conifer trees where they can fly onto the branches and shelter from blizzards.

Vocalizations
Wild turkeys have many calls: gobbles, plain yelp, cluck & purr, clucks, cutting, excited hen, fly down, tree yelp, old hen, kee kee, putts. In early spring, males older than a year old (called gobblers or toms) and, occasionally to a lesser extent, males younger than a year old (called "jakes") gobble to announce their presence to females and competing males. The gobble of a wild turkey can be heard up to a mile away. Males also emit a low-pitched "drumming" sound, produced by the movement of air in the air sac in the chest, similar to the booming of a prairie chicken. In addition they produce a sound known as the "spit" which is a sharp expulsion of air from this air sac.

Foraging

Wild turkeys are omnivorous, foraging on the ground or climbing shrubs and small trees to feed. They prefer eating acorns, nuts and other hard mast of various trees, including hazel, chestnut, hickory, and pinyon pine as well as various seeds, berries such as juniper and bearberry, buds, leaves, fern fronds, roots and insects. Turkeys also occasionally consume amphibians such as salamanders and small reptiles such as lizards and small snakes. Poults have been observed eating insects, berries, and seeds. Wild turkeys often feed in cow pastures, sometimes visit backyard bird feeders, and favor croplands after harvest to scavenge seeds on the ground. Turkeys are also known to eat a wide variety of grasses.

Turkey populations can reach large numbers in small areas because of their ability to forage for different types of food. Early morning and late afternoon are the desired times for eating.

Social structure and mating

Males are polygamous, mating with as many hens as they can. Male wild turkeys display for females by puffing out their feathers, spreading out their tails and dragging their wings. This behavior is most commonly referred to as strutting. Their heads and necks are colored brilliantly with red, white, and blue. The color can change with the turkey's mood, with a solid white head and neck being the most excited. They use gobbling, drumming/booming and spitting as signs of social dominance, and to attract females. Courtship begins during the months of March and April, which is when turkeys are still flocked together in winter areas.

Males may be seen courting in groups, often with the dominant male gobbling, spreading his tail feathers (strutting), drumming/booming and spitting. In a study, the average dominant male that courted as part of a pair of males fathered six more eggs than males that courted alone. Genetic analysis of pairs of males courting together shows that they are close relatives, with half of their genetic material being identical. The theory behind the team-courtship is that the less dominant male would have a greater chance of passing along shared genetic material than if it were courting alone.

When mating is finished, females search for nest sites. Nests are shallow dirt depressions engulfed with woody vegetation. Hens lay a clutch of 10–14 eggs, usually one per day. The eggs are incubated for at least 28 days. The poults are precocial and nidifugous, leaving the nest in about 12–24 hours.

Positive relationships with other wild species

Turkey are known to occasionally forage with deer and squirrels, and may even play with them. By foraging together, each can help the other watch for predators with their different senses: the deer with their improved olfactory sense, the turkey with its superior sight, and squirrels providing an additional set of eyes from the air.

Predators
Predators of eggs and nestlings include raccoons (Procyon lotor), Virginia opossums (Didelphis virginiana), striped skunks (Mephitis mephitis), gray foxes (Urocyon citnereoargenteus), groundhogs (Marmota monax), other rodents and spotted skunks (Spilogale ssp.). Predators of poults in addition to nestlings and eggs also include several species of snake, namely rat snakes (Elaphe ssp.), gopher snakes (Pituophis catenifer) and pinesnakes (Pituophis ssp.).

Avian predators of poults include raptors such as bald eagles (Haliaeetus leucocephalus), barred owl (Strix varia), red-shouldered (Buteo lineatus), red-tailed (Buteo jamaicensis), white-tailed (Geranoaetus albicaudatus), and Harris's hawks (Parabuteo unicinctus)—and the smallish Cooper's hawk (Accipiter cooperii) and broad-winged hawk (Buteo platypterus) (both likely of very small poults). Mortality of poults is greatest in the first 14 days of life, especially of those roosting on the ground, decreasing most notably after half a year, when they attain near adult sizes.

In addition to poults, hens and adult-sized fledglings (but not, as far as is known, adult male toms) are vulnerable to predation by great horned owls (Bubo virginianus), northern goshawk (Accipiter gentilis), domestic dogs (Canis familiaris), domestic cats (Felis catus), and red foxes (Vulpes vulpes). Predators of both adults and poults include coyotes (Canis latrans), gray wolves (Canis lupus), bobcats (Lynx rufus), cougars (Puma concolor), Canada lynx (Lynx canadensis), golden eagles (Aquila chrysaetos), and possibly American black bears (Ursus americanus), which also will eat the eggs if they find them. The American alligator (Alligator mississippiensis) is a predator to all turkeys of all ages in the Southeast and will eat them if they get too close to water. Humans are now the leading predator of adult turkeys. When approached by potential predators, turkeys and their poults usually run away rather than fly away from potential predators, though they may also fly short distances if pressed.

Occasionally, if cornered, adult turkeys may try to fight off predators and large male toms can be especially aggressive in self-defense. When fighting off predators, turkeys may kick with their legs, using the spurs on their back of the legs as a weapon, bite with their beak and ram with their relatively large bodies and may be able to deter predators up to the size of mid-sized mammals. Hen turkeys have been seen to chase off at least two species of hawks in flight when their poults are threatened.

Wild turkeys are not usually aggressive towards humans, but can be frightened or provoked to behave with aggression. They are most likely to attack if startled, cornered or harassed, or if approached too closely. They also have been seen to chase off humans as well. However, attacks and potential injuries can usually be avoided by giving wild turkeys a respectful amount of space and keeping outdoor spaces clean and undisturbed. Also, turkeys that are habituated to seeing people, at places like parks or campgrounds, can be very tame and will even feed from the hands of people. Male toms occasionally will attack parked cars and reflective surfaces, thinking they see another turkey and must defend their territory, but starting a car engine and moving the car is typically enough to scare it away.

Range and population
The wild turkey in the United States in 1957 ranged from Arizona to southeastern Oklahoma and thence through Tennessee, West Virginia, New York, and Ontario, and south to Florida and Texas. It formerly ranged north to southeastern South Dakota, southern Wisconsin, and southwestern Maine. The A.O.U. Checklist also described Upper Pliocene fossils in Kansas, and Pleistocene fossils widely from New Mexico to Pennsylvania and Florida. The Californian turkey (Meleagris californica) is an extinct species of turkey indigenous to the Pleistocene and early Holocene of California. It became extinct about 10,000 years ago. The present Californian wild turkey population derives from wild birds re-introduced during the 1960s and 70s from other areas by game officials. They proliferated after 2000 to become an everyday sight in the East Bay Area by 2015.

At the beginning of the 20th century the range and numbers of wild turkeys had plummeted due to hunting and loss of habitat. When Europeans arrived in the New World, they were found from Canada to Mexico in the millions. Europeans and their successors knew nothing about the life cycle of the bird and ecology itself as a science would come too late, not even in its infancy until the end of the 19th century whereas heavy hunting began in the 17th century. Deforestation destroyed trees turkeys need to roost in. Destruction of subtypes of environment like prairie grassland in the Midwest, canebrakes in the Southeast, and pine in the desert highlands made them easy prey for predators as there was nowhere to hide or lay eggs.

Game managers estimate that the entire population of wild turkeys in the United States was as low as 30,000 by the late 1930s. By the 1940s, it was almost totally extirpated from Canada and had become localized in pockets in the United States, in the north-east effectively restricted to the Appalachians, only as far north as central Pennsylvania. Early attempts used hand reared birds, a practice that failed miserably as the birds were unable to survive in the wild at all and many had imprinted far too much on people to effectively survive. Game officials later made efforts to protect and encourage the breeding of the surviving wild population. They would wait for numbers to grow, catch the surplus birds with a device that would have a projectile net that would ensnare the creature, move it to another unoccupied territory, and repeat the cycle. Over time this included some in the western states where it was not native. There is evidence that the bird does well when near farmland, which provides grain and also berry-bearing shrubs at its edges. As wild turkey numbers rebounded, hunting became legal in 49 U.S. states (excluding Alaska). In 1973, the total U.S. population was estimated to be 1.3 million, and current  estimates place the entire wild turkey population at 7 million individuals. Since the 1980s, "trap and transfer" projects have reintroduced wild turkeys to several provinces of Canada as well, sometimes from across the border in the United States. They appear to be very successful as of 2018 as wild turkeys have multiplied rapidly and flourished in places where they were not expected to survive by Canadian scientists, often quite far north of their original expected range.

Attempts to introduce the wild turkey to Britain as a game bird in the 18th century were not successful. George II is said to have had a flock of a few thousand in Richmond Park near London, but they were too easy for local poachers to destroy, and the fights with poachers became too dangerous for the gamekeepers. They were hunted with dogs and then shot out of trees where they took refuge. Several other populations, introduced or escaped, have survived for periods elsewhere in Britain and Ireland, but seem to have died out, perhaps from a combination of lack of winter feed and poaching. Small populations, probably descended from farm as well as wild stock, in the Czech Republic and Germany have been more successful, and there are wild populations of some size following introductions in Hawaii and New Zealand.

Subspecies
There are subtle differences in the coloration, habitat, and behavior of the different subspecies of wild turkeys. The six subspecies are:

Eastern wild turkey (Meleagris gallopavo silvestris) (Viellot, 1817)

This was the turkey subspecies Europeans first encountered in the wild: by the Puritans, the founders of Jamestown, the Dutch who lived in New York, and by the Acadians. Its range is one of the largest of all subspecies, covering the entire eastern half of the United States from Maine in the north to northern Florida and extending as far west as Minnesota, Illinois, and into Missouri. In Canada, its range extends into Southeastern Manitoba, Ontario, Southwestern Quebec (including Pontiac, Quebec and the lower half of the Western Quebec Seismic Zone), and the Maritime Provinces. They number from 5.1 to 5.3 million birds. The upper tail coverts are tipped with chestnut brown. Males can reach  in weight. The eastern wild turkey is heavily hunted in the Eastern USA and is the most hunted wild turkey subspecies.

Osceola wild turkey or Florida wild turkey (M. g. osceola) (Scott, 1890)
Most common in the Florida peninsula, they number from 80,000 to 100,000 birds. This bird is named for the famous Seminole leader Osceola, and was first described in 1890. It is smaller and darker than the eastern wild turkey. The wing feathers are very dark with smaller amounts of the white barring seen on other subspecies. Their overall body feathers are an iridescent green-purple color. They are often found in scrub patches of palmetto and occasionally near swamps, where amphibian prey is abundant. Osceola turkeys are the smallest subspecies weighing .

Rio Grande wild turkey (M. g. intermedia) (Sennett, 1879)

The Rio Grande wild turkey ranges through Texas to Oklahoma, Kansas, New Mexico, Colorado, Oregon, Utah, and was introduced to central and western California, as well as parts of a few northeastern states. It was also introduced to Hawaii in the late 1950s. Population estimates for this subspecies are around 1,000,000. This subspecies, native to the central plain states, was first described in 1879, and has relatively long legs, better adapted to a prairie habitat. Its body feathers often have a green-coppery sheen. The tips of the tail and lower back feathers are a buff-to-very light tan color. Its habitats are brush areas next to streams, rivers or mesquite, pine and scrub oak forests. The Rio Grande turkey is gregarious.

Merriam's wild turkey (M. g. merriami) (Nelson, 1900)

The Merriam's wild turkey ranges through the Rocky Mountains and the neighboring prairies of Wyoming, Montana and South Dakota, as well as much of the high mesa country of New Mexico, Arizona, southern Utah and The Navajo Nation, with number from 334,460 to 344,460 birds. The subspecies has also been introduced into Oregon. The initial releases of Merriam's turkeys in 1961 resulted in establishing a remnant population of Merriam's turkeys along the east-slope of Mt. Hood and natural immigration of turkeys from Idaho has established Merriam's flocks along the eastern border of Oregon. Merriam's wild turkeys live in ponderosa pine and mountainous regions. The subspecies was named in 1900 in honor of Clinton Hart Merriam, the first chief of the U.S. Biological Survey. The tail and lower back feathers have white tips and purple and bronze reflections.

Gould's wild turkey (M. g. mexicana) (Gould, 1856)

Native from the central valleys to the northern mountains of Mexico and the southernmost parts of Arizona and New Mexico. Gould's wild turkeys are heavily protected and regulated. The subspecies was first described in 1856. They exist in small numbers in the U.S. but are abundant in northwestern portions of Mexico. A small population has been established in southern Arizona. Gould's are the largest of the six subspecies. They have longer legs, larger feet, and longer tail feathers. The main colors of the body feathers are copper and greenish-gold. This subspecies is heavily protected owing to its skittish nature and threatened status.

South Mexican wild turkey (M. g. gallopavo) (Linnaeus, 1758)
The south Mexican wild turkey is considered the nominate subspecies, and the only one that is not found in the United States or Canada. In central Mexico, archaeological M. gallopavo bones have been identified at sites dating to 800–100 BC [10], [11]. It is unclear whether these early specimens represent wild or domestic individuals, but domestic turkeys were likely established in central Mexico by the first half of the Classic Period (c. AD 200–1000). Late Preclassic (300 BC–AD 100) turkey remains identified at the archaeological site of El Mirador (Petén, Guatemala) represent the earliest evidence of the export of the south Mexican wild turkey (Meleagris gallopavo gallopavo) to the ancient Maya world. The south Mexican wild subspecies, M. g. gallopavo, was domesticated either in Mexico or by Preclassic peoples in Mesoamerica, giving rise to the domestic turkey (M. g. domesticus). The Spaniards brought this tamed subspecies back to Europe with them in the mid-16th century; from Spain it spread to France and later Britain as a farmyard animal, usually becoming the centerpiece of a feast for the well-to-do. By 1620 it was common enough so that Pilgrim settlers of Massachusetts could bring turkeys with them from England, unaware that it had a larger close relative already occupying the forests of Massachusetts. It is one of the smallest subspecies and is best known in Spanish from its Aztec-derived name, guajolote. This wild turkey subspecies is thought to be critically endangered, as of 2010.

Benjamin Franklin and the myth of U.S. national bird suggestion
The idea that Benjamin Franklin preferred the turkey as the national bird of the United States comes from a letter he wrote to his daughter Sarah Bache on 26 January 1784. The main subject of the letter is a criticism of the Society of the Cincinnati, which he likened to a chivalric order, which contradicted the ideals of the newly founded American republic. In one section of the letter, Franklin remarked on the appearance of the bald eagle on the Society's crest:

Franklin never publicly voiced opposition to the bald eagle as a national symbol, nor did he ever publicly suggest the turkey as a national symbol.

Significance to Native Americans

The wild turkey, throughout its range, plays a significant role in the cultures of many Native American tribes all over North America. Outside of the Thanksgiving feast, it is a favorite meal in eastern tribes. Eastern Native American tribes consumed both the eggs and meat, sometimes turning the latter into a type of jerky to preserve it and make it last through cold weather. They provided habitat by burning down portions of forests to create meadows which would attract mating birds, and thus give a clear shot to hunters. The feathers of turkeys also often made their way into the rituals and headgear of many tribes. Many leaders, such as Catawba chiefs, traditionally wore turkey feather headdresses.

Significant peoples of several tribes, including Muscogee Creek and Wampanoag, wore turkey feather cloaks. The turkey clan is one of the three Lenape clans. Movements of wild turkeys inspired the Caddo tribe's turkey dance. The Navajo people of Northeastern Arizona, New Mexico and Utah call the turkey Tązhii and relate the bird to the corn and seeds which The Turkey in Navajo folklore brought from the Third Navajo World. It is one of the Navajos' sacred birds, with the Navajo people using the feathers and parts in multiple traditional ceremonies.

See also
 Heritage turkey
 Turkey calls
 Turkeypox virus

Notes

References
 Dickson, James G., The Wild Turkey: Biology and Management (A National Wild Turkey Federation and USDA Forest Service book), 1992, Stackpole Books, 9780811718592, google books
 Pritzker, Barry M. A Native American Encyclopedia: History, Culture, and Peoples. Oxford: Oxford University Press, 2000. .

External links

 Turkey as U.S. national bird
 Turkeys from England
National Wild Turkey Federation – Map of the locations of the five sub-species of wild turkey
View the turkey genome in Ensembl
 
 

Wild Turkey
Birds described in 1758
Birds of Canada
Game birds
Native American cuisine
Hunting in the United States
Birds of the United States
Birds of Mexico
Wild Turkey
Symbols of Alabama

nv:Tązhii